The Under Secretary for Memorial Affairs is a senior position within the United States Department of Veterans Affairs that directs the National Cemetery Administration, which maintains 150 national cemeteries and provides burial services for veterans of the United States military and eligible family members. 

The Under Secretary is nominated by the President and confirmed by the Senate. 

On April 19, 2021, President Joe Biden nominated Matthew T. Quinn to become the next Under Secretary of Veterans Affairs for Memorial Affairs. Quinn was confirmed by the Senate on June 17, 2021, by voice vote. He was sworn into office on June 23, 2021 by Secretary Denis McDonough.

History and responsibilities
In addition to the maintenance and operation of national cemeteries, the Under Secretary is also responsible for their land acquisition, design, and construction. Other memorial programs overseen by the Under Secretary include the provision of headstones, markers, and Presidential Memorial Certificates—engraved paper certificates signed by the current president—to honor deceased veterans' service. The Under Secretary also administers federal grants to help states establish state veterans' cemeteries.

The position was created by the Veterans Programs Enhancement Act of 1998, which was signed by President Clinton on November 11, 1998. As a result of the Act, the organization led by a Director, the National Cemetery System, evolved from an agency into an administration led by an Under Secretary when it was renamed to the National Cemetery Administration. From April 1998 to early September 2000, a series of Acting Directors and Acting Under Secretaries headed the Administration. Two of these were Roger R. Rapp and Mike Walker, with the latter later being confirmed by the United States Senate. They were followed by Under Secretaries Robin Higgins and John W. Nicholson.

List of Under Secretaries for Memorial Affairs
Originally, the position was Chief Memorial Affairs Director and then director of the National Cemetery System.

Public Law 105-368 (November 11, 1998) changed the National Cemetery System, headed by a Director, to the National Cemetery Administration, headed by the Under Secretary of Memorial Affairs.

The following individuals served as director or under secretary:

References

Under Secretary for Memorial Affairs